Arthur Cronin (29 November 1867 – 30 November 1926) was a British tennis player in the years before World War I. At Wimbledon he entered the singles four times between 1904 and 1910 and reached the quarter finals in 1905 (winning just two games against Major Ritchie).

References

1867 births
1926 deaths
19th-century male tennis players
Tennis people from Greater London
English male tennis players
British male tennis players